Isra Hirsi (born February 22, 2003) is an American environmental activist. She co-founded and served as the co-executive director of the U.S. Youth Climate Strike. In 2020, she was named in the Fortune's 40 Under 40 Government and Politics list. She is the daughter of U.S. Congresswoman Ilhan Omar.

Early life and activism

Hirsi was born on 22 February 2003 in Minneapolis, Minnesota and is the daughter of Somali American U.S. Congresswoman Ilhan Omar and Ahmed Abdisalan Hirsi. At the age of 12, she was one of the participants protesting for justice for Jamar Clark at the Mall of America. Hirsi attended Minneapolis South High School, from which she graduated in 2021. She became involved in climate activism after joining her high school's environmental club in her freshman year.

Hirsi coordinated the organization of hundreds of student-led strikes across the United States on March 15 and May 3, 2019. She co-founded the U.S. Youth Climate Strike, the American arm of a global youth climate change movement, in January 2019. She acts as the co-executive director of this group. In 2019, she won a Brower Youth Award. That same year, Hirsi received the Voice of the Future Award. In 2020, Hirsi was placed on BET's "Future 40" list.

Hirsi attends Barnard College of Columbia University as of fall 2021.

Hirsi endorsed Senator Bernie Sanders for President of the United States in the 2020 Democratic Party presidential primaries.

Authored articles

References

External links

 

2003 births
Living people
American environmentalists
Writers from Minneapolis
American women environmentalists
American child activists
Activists from Minnesota
American people of Somali descent
Climate activists
American communists
Youth climate activists
21st-century American women
Women civil rights activists
Barnard College alumni
21st-century African-American women